The thirteenth season of the American reality television series Food Network Star premiered June 4, 2017 on Food Network. Food Network chefs Bobby Flay and Giada de Laurentiis returned to the series as judges.

Contestants

Winner
 Jason Smith – Grayson, Kentucky

Runners-up
 Rusty Hamlin – Atlanta, Georgia
 Cory Bahr – Monroe, Louisiana

Eliminated

 Blake Baldwin – Flemington, New Jersey
 Nancy Manlove – Texas City, Texas
 Toya Boudy – New Orleans, Louisiana
 Suzanne Lossia – Detroit, Michigan
 Trace Barnett – Brilliant, Alabama
 Caodan Tran – Dallas, Texas
 Addie Gundry – Lake Forest, Illinois
 David Rose – Atlanta, Georgia
 Cory Bahr – Monroe, Louisiana (returned to the competition after winning Star Salvation)
 Amy Pottinger – Honolulu, Hawaii
 Matthew Grunwald – Scottsdale, Arizona

Contestant progress

: Cory did not compete in the mentor challenge.
: Cory was eliminated midway through the finale.
 (WINNER) The contestant won the competition and thus became the next Food Network Star.
 (RUNNER-UP) The contestant made it to the finale, but did not win.
 (HIGH) The contestant was one of the selection committee's favorites for that week.
 (IN) The contestant performed well enough to move on to the next week.  
 (LOW) The contestant was one of the selection committee's least favorites for that week, but was not eliminated.
 (OUT) The contestant was the selection committee's least favorite for that week, and was eliminated.

Comeback Kitchen

Contestants

Rob Burmeister, Season 12
Danushka Lysek, Season 9
Emilia Cirker, Season 11
Jamika Pessoa, Season 5
Josh Lyons, Season 8
Joy Thompson, Season 12
Matthew Grunwald, Season 11

Contestant progress

{| class="wikitable" align="" style="text-align:center"
! rowspan="2" |Contestant
! colspan="3" |Week
|-
|1
|2
|3
|-
| style="background:white" |Matthew
| style="background:cornflowerblue;" |HIGH
| style="background:limegreen; |WIN| style="background:midnightblue; color:#fff;" |WIN|-low
| style="background:white" |Jamika| style="background:cornflowerblue;" |HIGH
| style="background:pink;" |LOW
| style="background:lightgrey;" |OUT|-
| style="background:white" |Joy| style="background:cornflowerblue;" |HIGH
| style="background:limegreen;" |WIN| style="background:lightgrey;" |OUT|-
| style="background:white" |Danushka| style="background:pink;" |LOW
| style="background:pink;" |LOW
| style="background:lightgrey;" |OUT|-
| style="background:white" |Rob| style="background:cornflowerblue;" |HIGH
| style="background:limegreen;" |WIN| style="background:lightgrey;" |OUT|-
| style="background:white" |Emilia| style="background:pink;" |LOW
| style="background:lightgrey;" |OUT| style="background:darkgrey;" |
|-
| style="background:white" |Josh| style="background:lightgrey;" |OUT'| colspan="2" style="background:darkgrey;" |
|}

: Rob was eliminated after the mentor challenge. 
: Danushka and Joy were eliminated after the star challenge. 

 (WIN) The contestant won "Comeback Kitchen".
 (WIN) The contestant won the challenge for that week.
 (HIGH) The contestant did well in the challenge for that week.
 (LOW) The contestant was up for elimination, but was safe.
 (OUT) The contestant was eliminated.

Star Salvation
This season of Star Salvation was hosted by Iron Chef Alex Guarnaschelli and season 7 winner Jeff Mauro.

Contestant progress

 (WIN) The chef won Star Salvation and returned to the main competition.
 (IN) The chef continued in the competition.
 (OUT) The chef lost in that week's Star Salvation'' and was eliminated from the competition.

References

2017 American television seasons
Food Network Star